Clonmel railway station serves the town of Clonmel in County Tipperary, Ireland.

It has a weekday passenger service of two trains to Limerick Junction and two to Waterford. There is no Sunday service.

The station has a café (reopened in 2013), waiting room and toilets. Bus Éireann routes 55, 245 & 355 serve the station.

History
The Waterford and Limerick Railway opened the station on 1 May 1852. The company was renamed the Waterford, Limerick and Western in 1896 and merged with the Great Southern and Western Railway in 1901.

CIÉ withdrew passenger services from the Thurles – Clonmel line in 1963 and closed the line to freight in 1967.

Statistics

See also
 List of railway stations in Ireland

References

External links

South Tipperary Rail & Bus Website

1852 establishments in Ireland
Buildings and structures in Clonmel
Iarnród Éireann stations in County Tipperary
Railway stations opened in 1852
Railway stations in the Republic of Ireland opened in 1852